Albert Lauzemis (12 March 1918 – 10 April 1944) was a German U-boat commander in World War II.

Naval career
Albert Lauzemis joined Nazi Germany's Kriegsmarine in 1937. He went through U-boat training and U-boat familiarization (Baubelehrung) from June 1940 to February 1941. Lauzemis sailed on the boat for two patrols as 2WO and then for the third patrol as the First Watch Officer (1WO). He served on the boat until April 1942. During Lauzemis' stint on U-68 Merten sank eleven ships for over 63,000 tons. Lauzemis went through U-boat commander training with the 24th U-boat Flotilla in May 1942 and on 18 May he was given command of the small "duck" school boat . He only served there for six weeks before taking command of the much larger Type IX  on 1 July 1942. The hugely successful boat was by that time a school boat in the Baltic Sea. Lauzemis left the U-37 on 3 January 1943 and on the 21st took command of the U-68, his old boat. He left for his first war patrol as commander on 7 May 1943, heading for the Caribbean Sea. On the second patrol with the U-68 the outbound boat was attacked on 14 June 1943 having left base at Lorient only 2 days earlier. Lauzemis, the 2WO and another man were wounded and one lost overboard. The 1WO, Scherraus, brought the boat back to base. Lauzemis spent six weeks in hospital and was relieved of command during his recovery. During his five patrols, 228 days at sea, Lauzemis sank six ships for almost 28,000 tons. On 30 July Albert Lauzemis was again in command of his U-68 and took the boat out again on 14 August 1943. Lauzemis was killed when the boat was sunk on 10 April 1944 north-west of Madeira, Portugal, in position , by depth charges and rockets from Avenger and Wildcat aircraft of the US escort carrier .

Summary of Career

Ships sunk

Awards
Iron Cross 2nd Class
Iron Cross 1st Class
German Cross in Gold - 6 November 1943 (posthumous)

References

Bibliography

1918 births
1944 deaths
Deaths by airstrike during World War II
Kriegsmarine personnel killed in World War II
People who died at sea
Recipients of the Gold German Cross
U-boat commanders (Kriegsmarine)